Prabir Mitra (born 18 August 1941) is a Bangladeshi film actor. He won Bangladesh National Film Award for Best Supporting Actor for his performance in the film Boro Bhalo Lok Chhilo in 1982. He also won the 2018 Lifetime Achievement Award.As of 2019, he has worked in over 400 films.

Early life and career
Mitra grew up in Dhaka. He studied in Pogose School along with ATM Shamsuzzaman.

Mitra started his acting career with the theatre group Lalkuthi. He debuted in film acting through the film Jolchobi (1973).

Personal life
Mitra was married to Ajanta Mitra (d. 2000).

Filmography
 Titash Ekti Nadir Naam (1973)
 Nawab Sirajuddaula (1989)
 Nekabborer Mohaproyan (2014)
 Shankhachil (2016)

References

External links
 

Living people
1940 births
Bengali Hindus
Bangladeshi Hindus
Bangladeshi male film actors
Bangladeshi male stage actors
Bangladeshi male television actors
National Film Award (Bangladesh) for Lifetime Achievement recipients
Place of birth missing (living people)
Best Supporting Actor National Film Award (Bangladesh) winners
Pogose School alumni